Dominique Coene and Kristof Vliegen were the defending champions, but they did not compete in the Juniors this year.

Frank Dancevic and Giovanni Lapentti defeated Bruno Echagaray and Santiago González in the final, 6–1, 6–4 to win the boys' doubles tennis title at the 2001 Wimbledon Championships.

Seeds

  Bruno Echagaray /  Santiago González (final)
  Alejandro Falla /  Carlos Salamanca (first round)
  Tomáš Berdych /  Bart de Gier (first round)
  Ytai Abougzir /  Luciano Vitullo (first round)
  Marcelo Melo /  Lionel Noviski (first round)
  Ryan Henry /  Todd Reid (first round)
  Paul Capdeville /  Óscar Posada (second round)
  Frank Dancevic /  Giovanni Lapentti (champions)

Draw

Finals

Top half

Bottom half

References

External links

Boys' Doubles
Wimbledon Championship by year – Boys' doubles